Tarong is a rural locality in the South Burnett Region, Queensland, Australia.

The area is best known for the Tarong Power Station which is located next to the Meandu Mine.

History
The name Tarong derives from the name of a pastoral run first used in 1850; it is probably based on an Aboriginal word tarum meaning wild lime tree.

In April 1921, two subdivisions at Nanango and Tarong Estate and Township were advertised for auction by John Darley and Isles, Love and Co. The Tarong Estate, twelve miles from Nanango and Tarong Railway Station offered 25 agricultural farms and 62 town allotments while the Grange Estate, eleven miles from Nanango and 18 miles from Kingaroy in the Parish of Booie offered 15 dairy farms.

Tarong State School opened in 1925 and closed circa 1942.

Heritage listings
Tarong has a number of heritage-listed sites, including:
 Cooyar Road: Tarong Homestead

References

South Burnett Region
Localities in Queensland